This list of American journalism awards provides an index to articles about notable awards given in the United States for journalism. Some awards are restricted to a given region or state, and most are restricted to American journalists or companies. The list includes general awards, awards for investigative and sports journalism, fellowships, and lists of categories of Pulitzer Prizes and Gerald Loeb Awards.

General list

Investigative journalism

Investigative journalists research in depth a topic such as a serious crime or incident of political corruption or corporate wrongdoing. They may spend months or years researching and preparing a report.

Sports journalism

Sports journalism covers matters pertaining to sporting topics and competitions.

Other specific topics

Fellowships

Pulitzer Prizes for journalism

 Pulitzer Prize for Beat Reporting
 Pulitzer Prize for Breaking News Photography
 Pulitzer Prize for Breaking News Reporting
 Pulitzer Prize for Commentary
 Pulitzer Prize for Correspondence
 Pulitzer Prize for Criticism
 Pulitzer Prize for Editorial Cartooning
 Pulitzer Prize for Editorial Writing
 Pulitzer Prize for Explanatory Reporting
 Pulitzer Prize for Feature Writing
 Pulitzer Prize for International Reporting
 Pulitzer Prize for Investigative Reporting
 Pulitzer Prize for Local Reporting
 Pulitzer Prize for National Reporting
 Pulitzer Prize for Photography
 Pulitzer Prize for Public Service
 Pulitzer Prize for Reporting
Pulitzer Prize Special Citations and Awards

Gerald Loeb Award winners

 Gerald Loeb Award winners for Audio and Video
 Gerald Loeb Award winners for Breaking News
 Gerald Loeb Award winners for Broadcast
 List of Gerald Loeb Business Book Award winners
 Gerald Loeb Award winners for Columns, Commentary, and Editorials
 Gerald Loeb Award winners for Deadline and Beat Reporting
 Gerald Loeb Award winners for Explanatory
 Gerald Loeb Award winners for Feature
 Gerald Loeb Award winners for Images, Graphics, Interactives, and Visuals
 Gerald Loeb Award winners for International
 Gerald Loeb Award winners for Investigative
 Gerald Loeb Award winners for Large Newspapers
 Gerald Loeb Award winners for Local
 Gerald Loeb Award winners for Magazines
 List of winners of the Gerald Loeb Newspaper Award
 Gerald Loeb Award winners for News Service, Online, and Blogging
 Gerald Loeb Award winners for Personal Finance and Personal Service
 Gerald Loeb Award winners for Radio
 List of winners of the Gerald Loeb Award for Small and Medium Newspapers
 Gerald Loeb Award winners for Spot News
 Gerald Loeb Award winners for Television
 Gerald Loeb Lifetime Achievement Award winners
 Gerald Loeb Memorial Award winners
 Gerald Loeb Special Award winners

See also

 Lists of awards
 List of journalism awards

References

 
American
Journalism